This is a list of television serial dramas released by TVB in 2016.

Top ten drama series in ratings
The following is a list of TVB's top serial dramas in 2016 by average ratings. The list includes premiere week, final week, and the finale episode ratings, as well as the average overall count of live Hong Kong viewers (in millions).

Notes
A  Average numbers are derived from consolidated ratings as reported by Nielsen and on TVB's annual report. A consolidated rating is defined as the summation of TV ratings, online live rating, and online catch-up rating.

Awards

First line-up
These dramas air in Hong Kong from 8:00pm to 8:30pm, Monday to Friday on Jade.

Second line-up
These dramas air in Hong Kong from 8:30pm to 9:30pm, Monday to Friday on Jade.

Third line-up
These dramas air in Hong Kong from 9:30pm to 10:30pm, Monday to Sunday on Jade.

Weekend dramas
These dramas air in Hong Kong every Saturday or Sunday night from 8:00pm to 9:00pm on Jade.

myTV SUPER original programs
The following are original programs distributed by myTV SUPER, a video on demand streaming media service developed and operated by TVB. The service also offers exclusive distribution of non-TVB programs in Hong Kong.

Drama

Film

Notes 
Rogue Emperor 流氓皇帝; Copyright notice: 2015.

References

External links
TVB.com Official Website 

2016
2016 in Hong Kong television